Estonian Agricultural Museum is an agricultural museum in Ülenurme, Tartu County, Estonia. The museum exhibits Estonian rural heritage, including culinary traditions. The museum has also the biggest collection of pre-WW2 steam engines and locomotives in Estonia.

Some activities in museum: 
 baking rye bread
 grain and flax processing
 wood and metal working
 exhibiting farm animal breeds.

References

External links
 

Museums in Estonia
Tartu County
Agriculture in Estonia